The  is an  or  (painted narrative handscroll) from the end of the 12th century, in either the  or  periods of Japanese history. An illuminated manuscript, it was originally made up of a long paper scroll decorated with paint and calligraphy, and is now separated into four parts, all of which are held by the Museum of Fine Arts, Boston. It recounts the legend associated with the voyage of the Japanese Minister  to Imperial China of the Tang dynasty in the 8th century.

Background

Originating in Japan in the sixth or seventh century through trade with the Chinese Empire,  art spread widely among the aristocracy in the  period. An  consists of one or more long scrolls of paper narrating a story through  texts and paintings. The narrative assumes a series of scenes, the rhythm, composition and transitions of which are entirely the artist's sensitivity and technique. The themes of the stories were very varied: illustrations of novels, historical chronicles, religious texts, biographies of famous people, humorous or fantastic anecdotes, etc.

Description

It dates from the second half of the 12th century (end of the  period (794–1185) or early  period (1185–1333)), when a renewed interest in the narrative subjects and life of the people was reflected in the topics of contemporary .

The main character in the work is Japanese Minister  (693–775), whose diplomatic trips to the powerful Tang court in China have inspired legendary chronicles. The  takes as its theme an episode from these legends: the adventures of  while staying at the Chinese Imperial Palace, where Chinese intellectuals and nobles wanted to put his wisdom and intelligence to the test. Secluded in a tower, Kibi had to accomplish three tasks: write an exegesis of a voluminous Chinese anthology, win a game of Go, and provide a commentary on a sophisticated and tortuous poem. The Minister managed to pass all of the tests, with the help of Japanese deities.

The scroll is divided into six sections, each including text and illustrations:

 The introductory text of the work is lost, but the image shows 's arrival by boat in China. There, a group of Chinese officials is waiting to take him to the palace, where he will be held in a tower.
 A Chinese official submits to  his first test, writing the exegesis of the famous Chinese anthology of poetry and literature entitled .
  writes his exegesis on the backs of calendars. A Chinese scholar comes to test 's knowledge of the text, but cannot fault it.
 Court officials hold a meeting, at which they plan to kill  if he loses in the second event: the game of Go. The demon warns the Minister of these sinister plans and teaches him the basics of the game.
 A Go master comes to challenge  who manages to win by swallowing a coin. Suspicious, the master forces  to take a purgative, but the latter conceals the coin using magic.

, with the help of the demon, then makes the Chinese sun and moon disappear, forcing the terrified Imperial court to give him back his freedom. It is likely that a second scroll narrating the end of the legend originally existed, or was part of later versions.

Style and composition

The , like all  of its time, was created in the then fashionable  style of Japanese painting.

Perspective is rendered in a cavalier unrealistic manner, with long diagonals, while no landscape appears, except trees that decrease in size as they approach the horizon.

The very colourful, predominantly red paintings were realised using the  technique: first, a sketch of the outlines was done, then the opaque colour was added en aplat, and finally the outlines and small details were redrawn in ink over the paint.

The artist seems to have had limited knowledge of the ancient Tang dynasty China, where the story takes place: rather the work is inspired by Japanese Buddhist paintings of the 11th and 12th centuries, usually based on Chinese models.

The faces of the Chinese people in the work are very expressive, almost caricatural, but not very individualised.

Historiographical value

The paintings in the work also depict the game of Go, which has existed for millennia in Asia, as it was practised at the time of the work's creation, and that has actually changed very little since then.

Provenance

In 1923,  sold the work to  II, who in turn sold it in 1932 to the Museum of Fine Arts, Boston, through an expert from the museum, . This overseas sale provoked outrage in Japan, prompting the government to amend legislation to limit or ban the export of important artistic objects from the country.

Today, very few original works from the primitive and classical  period remain.

See also
List of National Treasures of Japan (paintings)
National Treasure (Japan)

References

Notes

Bibliography

External links

 Images of the work – part 1, part 2, part 3, part 4 – website of the Museum of Fine Arts, Boston

Emakimono
Paintings in the collection of the Museum of Fine Arts, Boston